PT Surya Citra Media Tbk (SCM) is an Indonesian mass media company owned by Elang Mahkota Teknologi and is based in Jakarta. It operates four nation's television networks, SCTV, Indosiar, Ajwa TV, and Mentari TV, as well as the Vidio streaming service, Nex Parabola satellite pay television, and KapanLagi Youniverse.

Profile 
Surya Citra Media was established on 29 January 1999 as Cipta Aneka Selaras, with a focus on business areas covering multimedia, entertainment and communications services, particularly in the field of television. In 2001, Cipta Aneka Selaras changed its name to Surya Citra Media.

Surya Citra, whose shares are listed on the Indonesia Stock Exchange under the code "SCMA". Surya Citra Televisi (SCTV) is a subsidiary of Surya Citra Media. SCTV commenced its commercial broadcast in 1990 covering the city of Surabaya, and began operating nationwide in 1993, soon later SCTV headquarters was moved to Jakarta. In May 2013, Indosiar Karya Media absorbed into SCM.

On December 26, 2016, SCM took back over SinemArt from MNC Media due to very low viewers' performance. In addition, MNC itself wants to aim for content alignment as well as the development of digital assets and production houses owned by the group, so that SinemArt is fully returned to SCM having been working collabs in years 2003 till 2007.

References

External links 
 

Elang Mahkota Teknologi
Companies based in Jakarta
Mass media companies established in 1999
Entertainment companies of Indonesia
Mass media companies of Indonesia
Companies listed on the Indonesia Stock Exchange
1999 establishments in Indonesia
2002 initial public offerings